Stadio del Lido is a football stadium in Locarno, Switzerland. It is the home ground of FC Locarno and has a capacity of 5,000. The stadium has 1,000 seats and 4,000 standing places.

See also 
List of football stadiums in Switzerland

External links 
     floor plan

Sports venues in Ticino
Lido
FC Locarno